The pale-browed treehunter (Cichlocolaptes leucophrus) is a species of bird in the family Furnariidae. It is endemic to Brazil. Its natural habitats are subtropical or tropical moist lowland forest and subtropical or tropical moist montane forest.

References

Cichlocolaptes
Birds of the Atlantic Forest
Endemic birds of Brazil
Birds described in 1830
Taxonomy articles created by Polbot
Taxa named by Sir William Jardine
Taxa named by Prideaux John Selby